A disease-modifying osteoarthritis drug (DMOAD) is a disease-modifying drug that would inhibit or even reverse the progression of osteoarthritis. Since the main hallmark of osteoarthritis is cartilage loss, a typical DMOAD would prevent the loss of cartilage and potentially regenerate it. Other DMOADs may attempt to help repair adjacent tissues by reducing inflammation. A successful DMOAD would be expected to show an improvement in patient pain and function with an improvement of the health of the joint tissues.

Approved for human use 
There are currently no DMOADs approved for human use.

Drugs with undergoing human trials

Drugs under investigation 

Gene therapy for osteoarthritis is also being investigated as technology to create a drug that would act as a disease modifying drug. Several approved drugs are being investigated as repurposed agents in the treatment of osteoarhritis such as liraglutide (anti-diabetic and anti-obesity drug: NCT02905864), Metformin (anti-diabetic drug: NCT04767841, NCT05034029), Zoledronic acid (anti-osteoporotic drug: NCT04303026), etc.

Paroxetine has been deemed to have dmoad activity.

References 

Arthritis